Abiquiu Dam is a dam on the Rio Chama, located about  northwest of Santa Fe in Rio Arriba County, New Mexico, USA. The dam's primary purpose is flood control, in addition to irrigation and municipal water storage, and hydroelectric generation.

History
The first proposal for a flood control dam on the Rio Chama was introduced in the Flood Control Act of 1948. In the 1950s a dam at Abiquiu was added to the project, and it was later determined that a single high dam at this site would be sufficient. In the subsequent Flood Control Act of 1960, the Chamita dam was removed from the project. Construction of Abiquiu Dam began in 1956 and the river was diverted in July 1959. Limited flood control operations began in 1962 and the dam was completed on February 5, 1963, at a cost of $21.2 million.

Upgrades
The dam initially functioned as a dry dam, with a very small permanent reservoir pool for sediment trapping purposes.

Hydroelectric plant
In 1990 a small power station was constructed at the dam base providing a capacity of 13.5 megawatts (MW). Between 2009 and 2011, the addition of a turbine increased the plant's capacity to 16.5 MW. The hydroelectric plant is operated by Los Alamos County Department of Public Utilities.

See also

List of dams and reservoirs in the United States
List of largest reservoirs in the United States
Rio Grande

References

Dams in New Mexico
Dams completed in 1963
Energy infrastructure completed in 1963
United States Army Corps of Engineers dams
Earth-filled dams
Hydroelectric power plants in New Mexico
Dams in the Rio Grande basin
1963 establishments in New Mexico